Byen og verden (lit. The City and the World) is a 1993 novel by Danish author Peer Hultberg. It won the Nordic Council's Literature Prize in 1993.

References

1993 Danish novels
Danish-language novels
Nordic Council's Literature Prize-winning works